Estee (Etty) Shiraz (Hebrew: אסתי שירז), is an American-Israeli entrepreneur, communication expert and mediator, and the founder of a US lifestyle magazine and a nonprofit organization aimed to improve Israel’s image around the world through non-political activity.

Early life and career

Born and raised in Tel Aviv, Israel, Shiraz started her career in 1994 as a spokesperson and director of public relations at the Opera Tower residential and commercial center, completed that year by the Alrov Group.

In 1997, Shiraz joined Spot Productions Ltd., the company producing Deadly Fortune (Kesef Katlani) - then a startup TV series, as VP of marketing and public relations. The series was aired on prime time in Channel 2 during its first two seasons, and later on in Channel 3 (seasons 3 and 4), and topped the Israeli television ratings. It included the actors Nathan Ravitz, Rafi Tavor, Aharon Ipale, and Yossi Graber in the leading roles  and was sold to broadcasting channels in Europe as well.

Politics
Shiraz went into politics in 2000 and was appointed head of communications at 'Gesher' political party and its non-profit organization. In November 2002, Shiraz was elected by the party's members as the head of the party, after David Levy, its founder and leader, moved back to the Likud. Shiraz led 'Gesher' in the elections for the 16th Israeli Parliament, the "Knesset", a move followed by a surprising political and legal battle in the years to come, with David Levy fighting to dismantle Gesher and relate to his move as a merge of his political party in its entirety with the Likud, and Shiraz and the rest of the party’s members aiming to leave the party intact and transform it into a modern social party, appealing to Israel's young academics and professionals.  

Following the Court's decision to instruct the Central Elections Committee to remove the Gesher Knesset list during the process, Shiraz was appointed director of operations and campaign advisor to Dr. Lea Nass-Arden - a politically unknown candidate at that point - and built the campaign on the concept of Nass being the only religious woman in the Likud primary elections for the 16th Knesset. The campaign brought Nass to be placed 36th in the Likud list of candidates, and when the Likud won 38 seats that year, Nass-Arden became a Knesset member, and later on was appointed Deputy Minister of Pensioner Affairs. Shiraz moved with her family to the US in 2003, and the process of legal motions and appeals by the party's members and David Levy, continued until 2007, with the court's decision that Gesher would cease to exist as a political party.

Recent

Shiraz moved with her family to Miami, Florida, in 2003, and founded Promise Lifestyle Magazine in order to offer an appealing  publication to the Jewish American population. The publication featured profile articles and interviews with high-profile business people, public figures, and celebrities, such as Michael Douglas, Barbra Streisand, Adam Sandler, Ben Stiller, Dustin Hoffman, and Natalie Portman. Regular contributors throughout the years included Dr. Ruth Westheimer, Uri Geller, and Bernie De Koven.

In 2005-2006, Shiraz was chair of Ft. Lauderdale-Haifa sister cities, and a member of the board of directors for the Greater Ft. Lauderdale Sister Cities International non-profit organization (GFLSCI), whose goal is to develop municipal partnerships between U.S. cities and states and similar jurisdictions in other nations.

In 2009, Shiraz established a communications and PR firm. She was named 'Woman of Excellence' by the National Association of Professional & Executive Women, and has won various awards including the American Graphic Design Award, Benjamin Franklin Award and Florida Print Award.

Personal life and current career

Shiraz is a certified Florida Supreme Court mediator, and is focused in recent years on mediating high conflict cases and disputes, in addition to her long-lasting activity as a publisher, entrepreneur, linguist and communication expert. She has been known to bring tough civil, commercial and family disputes to a resolution, with an unusually high success rate, independently and at the Los Angeles Superior Court. She mediates divorce, civil harassment, domestic violence, small claims, and other conflicts as a panel mediator for the Center for Conflict Resolution (CCR) and the California Academy of Mediation Professionals (CAMP), and is a member of South California Mediators Association. She regularly trains and is observed by attorneys and MBA students of the internationally recognized Alternative Dispute Resolution programs at USC and the Pepperdine University Schools of Law. Shiraz is also the founder of a non-profit organization aimed to change the image of the State of Israel around the world.

A double major in Special Education and Humanities, Shiraz earned her bachelor's degree from Tel Aviv University, where she graduated magna cum laude, and received her master's degree in Communications, Journalism and Political Science from Bar Ilan University. During those years, she experimented with modeling, working as a flight attendant and on board cruise ships, fulfilling her strong desire to be exposed to different countries, people and cultures. She resides in Los Angeles, CA.

References

1968 births
Living people
People from Tel Aviv
People from Beverly Hills, California
Bar-Ilan University alumni
Tel Aviv University alumni
21st-century Israeli women politicians
Israeli emigrants to the United States
Gesher (political party) politicians
Leaders of political parties in Israel